Brave and Beautiful is a Turkish thriller television series produced by Ay Yapım that was aired on Star TV on 10 November 2016. It stars Kıvanç Tatlıtuğ as Cesur Alemdaroğlu and Tuba Büyüküstün as Sühan Korludağ.

Synopsis
Cesur Alemdaroğlu (Kivanç Tatlituğ) comes back to Korludağ, a small town outside Istanbul with a mission: to take revenge on Tahsin Korludağ (Tamer Levent) because of their family enmity. The only thing that he hadn't taken into account was that he would fall in love with Sühan Korludağ (Tuba Büyüküstün), the beautiful daughter of the man whom he believes killed his father. Sühan is an independent and successful businesswoman who creates her own brand of perfumes and glass products. Fiercely loyal to her family, Sühan doesn't fully trust Cesur at first, but as the lies and misdeeds of Korludağ are uncovered one after another, she finds herself torn between her father and the man she has grown to love. Cesur realizes Korludağ has many enemies around him when things take a more dangerous twist as Rıza Chirpiji (Yiğit Özşener), the killer brother of Adalet Korludağ (Nihan Büyükağaç) a.k.a. Tahsin Korludağ's mistress, is released after a 30-year jail sentence. A huge game of cat-and-mice ensues as Cesur and Sühan find themselves in the midst of a long historical family feud. Sühan and Cesur's relationship deepens and she becomes pregnant from Cesur. After a long battle between Cesur and Tahsin, Rıza attempts to kill Sühan, which makes them reach an agreement. Sühan is critically injured and taken to hospital. Her father Tahsin and Cesur cooperate to set a trap for Rıza, while seeking a final escape. Rıza is captured by Cesur and Tahsin. When Cesur is about to kill him, Tahsin saves Cesur from being killed, sacrificing himself with Rıza in a boat gas explosion. In the end Sühan gives birth to Cesur's child, the two are then seen on a voyage with their baby boy, smiling at each other

Cast 
 Kıvanç Tatlıtuğ as Cesur Alemdaroğlu Karahasanoğlu
 Tuba Büyüküstün as Sühan Korludağ
 Tamer Levent as Tahsin Korludağ
 Devrim Yakut as Mihriban Aydınbaş
 Erkan Avcı as Korhan Korludağ
 Serkan Altunorak as Bülent Aydınbaş
 Sezin Akbaşoğulları as Cahide Korludağ
 Müfit Kayacan as Rıfat İlbey
 Nihan Büyükağaç as Adalet Soyözlü
 Fırat Altunmeşe as Kemal
 Irmak Örnek as Şirin
 Okday Korunan as Salih
 Gözde Türkpençe as Banu
 Işıl Dayıoğlu as Reyhan
 Zeynep Kızıltan as Hülya
 Cansu Türedi as Necla
 Tilbe Saran as Fügen Karahasanoğlu
 Ali Pinar as Hasan Karahasanoğlu
 Yiğit Özşener as Rıza

International broadcast

Series overview

Accolades

See also
Television in Turkey
List of Turkish television series
Turkish television drama

References

External links 

 
 
 Cesur ve Güzel BeyazPerde.com   
 Cesur ve Güzel Sinematurk.com

Star TV (Turkey) original programming
Urdu 1 original programming
Urdu 1
Turkish drama television series
2016 Turkish television series debuts
Turkish television series endings
Television series produced in Istanbul
Television shows set in Istanbul
Television series set in the 2010s